Centennial Tower  may refer to:

 Centennial Tower (Atlanta) 
 Centennial Tower (Philadelphia), a planned but unbuilt 1000-feet-tall tower for the Centennial Exposition 1876
 City Center Building, briefly known as the Centennial Tower, Hayward, California
 Centennial Tower (Philippines)
 Centennial Tower (Singapore)
 Centennial Tower (Midland), a highrise building in Midland, Texas
 Centennial Memorial Tower in Nopporo Shinrin Kōen Prefectural Natural Park, Hokkaidō, Japan